Rajiv Gandhi Institute of Technology (RIT) (Government Engineering College), Kottayam, India is a state government-owned engineering college in the southern Indian state of Kerala. Located 14 km away from Kottayam, Kerala, India, near Pampady, the institute was founded in 1991 by the Government of Kerala. The college is affiliated to the APJ Abdul Kalam Technological University since its inception in 2015.

Academics

Academic programmes

Undergraduate programmes

Regular (B.Tech.)

Civil Engineering
Computer Science and Engineering
Electrical and Electronics Engineering
Electronics and Communication Engineering
Mechanical Engineering
Bachelor of Architecture
Robotics and Artificial Intelligence

Postgraduate programmes

Master of Computer Applications (MCA)
Computer Applications

The institute offers two year master's degree in Computer Applications since 2001. The LBS, Kerala, conducts Entrance Examinations for admission to MCA, which is made through a Single Window System of the Centralised Allotment Process (CAP).

Masters in Technology (M.Tech.)
Civil Engineering
Transportation Engineering
Electrical and Electronics Engineering
Industrial Drives & Control
Electronics and Communication Engineering
Advanced Communication & Information Systems
Advanced Electronics & Communication Engineering 
Mechanical Engineering
Industrial Engineering and Management
Computer Science and Engineering

Ph.D Programmes

Electrical Engineering
Civil Engineering

Admissions

Admission of the undergraduate students to the institute is through an engineering entrance examination conducted by the Government of Kerala.

Admissions to the postgraduate courses in engineering are usually made through GATE (Graduate Aptitude Test in Engineering), with separate entrance tests for admissions to the MCA course.

Admissions to undergraduate architecture course is through National Aptitude Test in Architecture (NATA).

Other academic activities

ICRIT

Rajiv Gandhi Institute of Technology hosts National Conference on Recent Innovations in Technology (NCRIT) which aims at providing a common platform for professionals, academicians, researchers, and industrialists together to share their knowledge and ideas for achieving focused developments and advancements in engineering and management, through technical paper presentations and panel discussions. The topics for the conference are chosen based on the thrust areas of research in academia and in industry. NCRIT 2009 was held on 28 March 2009. NCRIT 2010 was held on 4 March 2010.

Rajiv Gandhi Institute of Technology hosted International Conference on Recent Innovations in Technology (ICRIT) from 2011. ICRIT 2011 was held during February 2011 and ICRIT 2012 during 12–14 January 2012.

NATCON 2013
RIT in association with The Centre for Engineering Research and Development (CERD), Government of Kerala, is part of the organizing team of National Technological Congress (NATCON). The conference is designed to boost research activities in engineering colleges. It will also be a platform for talented academicians, students scientists to share their experiences and knowledge. The third edition of the NATCON will be held on 17–19 January 2013.

Student life

Student organisations
 SAE
 Students' Federation of India (SFI)
 IEEE 
 TinkerHub
 Indian Society for Technical Education
 Astronomical Society of RIT
 BODHI, RIT Quiz Club
 IEDC Start-up Bootcamp
 National Service Scheme (NSS)
 Kerala Students Union (KSU)
 Society of Student Architects

Events

Ritu 
Ritu is the name of an annual techno-cultural fest of RIT. The event consists of a wide variety of programmes and competitions in technical and cultural fields. Ritu is one of the tech-fests in Kerala having large footfalls.

Department festivals

Several departments organize department festivals.

Keli
Keli is the name of an annual arts festival conducted at RIT. The event is a colourful exhibition of diverse talents possessed by the students of RIT. The event is made competitive by grouping the entire college into 5 groups each named as part of a traditional piece of art, Sruthi, Noopura, Pallavi, Surabhi and Thillana.

Aaravam
Aaravam is the name of the annual Sports festival organised at the RIT.

RITunes

RITunes is a community podcast initiative by the College Union, focusing on the experiences of the students of the college. There currently are 6 hosts, of various college departments. The podcast is student-managed, with plans to extend to a live radio format in the future. The first episode aired on 18 May 2020, on Spotify and RadioPublic.

Transport

Road: There are bus services to Kottayam from almost all major cities in Kerala, Tamil Nadu and Karnataka. The college is located at Nedumkuzhy on the KK road (NH 220). The private and KSRTC bus stations are situated 14 km away. The KSRTC renders bus services from Kottayam to Kumily every 20 minutes, which can be availed to travel to the college.
Rail: The college is located 14 km from Kottayam Railway Station.
Air: The nearest airport is at Nedumbassery, Kochi, 89 km from Kottayam.
Within Kottayam: The college can be reached from the KSRTC Bus Stand, Private Bus Stand (Kottayam) and Sasthry Road by taking buses to Pampady, Ponkunnam, Kumali, or Kanjirappally and disembarking at Nedumkuzhy bus stop. The college is 1 km from the bus stop. The college can be reached from Kottayam railway station by taking buses from Logos Junction. Auto rickshaws are available at Nedumkuzhy. 
The college is connected to tourist centres in the High Ranges like Kuttikkanam (60 km), Thekkady (96 km), Kumily (97 km), Peermade (70 km) Parunthumpara (72 km), Kattappana (101 km), Nedumkandam (118 km), Chemmannar (137 km), Cumbummettu (119 km), Thookkupalam (116 km), etc.

Gallery

References

External links

 Official website
 Student-alumni portal
Official Facebook page
Official Instagram account

Engineering colleges in Kerala
Universities and colleges in Kottayam
Colleges affiliated to Mahatma Gandhi University, Kerala
Educational institutions established in 1991
1991 establishments in Kerala